Hardee Apartments, also known as Jarrell Apartments, is a historic apartment building located at High Point, Guilford County, North Carolina. It was built in 1924, and is a two-story, four unit, Mission Revival style building.  The frame building has a stuccoed finish.  It features massive two-tiered corner porches and a pair of central stair entrances.

It was listed on the National Register of Historic Places in 1993.  It is located in the Uptown Suburbs Historic District.

References

Buildings and structures in High Point, North Carolina
Residential buildings on the National Register of Historic Places in North Carolina
Mission Revival architecture in North Carolina
Residential buildings completed in 1924
Buildings and structures in Guilford County, North Carolina
National Register of Historic Places in Guilford County, North Carolina
Historic district contributing properties in North Carolina